Kilmeny may refer to:

Kilmeny (film), 1915 film
Kilmeny, Islay, village on Islay, Argyll and Bute, Scotland
Kilmeny (poem), James Hogg 1813, the best known part of The Queen's Wake

Personal name
Kilmeny Gordon, protagonist of Kilmeny of the Orchard, 1910 novel by Lucy Maud Montgomery
Kilmeny Niland (1950–2009), Australian artist